Scaffaiolo Lake is a lake in the provinces of Pistoia (Tuscany) and Modena (Emilia-Romagna), Italy. At an elevation of 1775 m, its surface area is 0.05 km2.

Lakes of Emilia-Romagna
Lakes of Tuscany